The EU Thailand National Inter-varsity Debate Championship, more commonly known as EU-TH, is a purely student-led debate tournament originally evolving from the European Union-Thammasat University (EU-TU) Intra-varsity Debate Championship in 2004 at Thammasat University and was open for university students across Thailand. Starting in 2005, for five years, Thammasat University hosted the tournament and directed it to grow in size and quality by including other universities including Assumption University, Chulalongkorn University, Kasetsart University and Mahidol University International College. In 2008, with increasing popularity and high standards of the debate the scope of the event was even more broadened to include teams of high-schools students. Each year, the delegation of European Union to Thailand serves as the primary title sponsor of the event and a member of the adjudicator panel for the Grand Finals.

In 2010, Mahidol University International College (MUIC) was selected to be the host and co-organiser of the event in an open bidding process during the Thai National Debate Council. It was the first time that training workshops were held in four different provinces of Thailand (Southern, Central, Northeastern and Northern) for the run-up to the Championship's final round in Bangkok. More than 300 students from 26 universities participated, representing all regions of the Kingdom. As a result, the level of debate and the participants' performance continued to improve. Also, for the first time, the tournament was held under the environment-conscious theme "Offsetting Carbon, Offsetting Ignorance".

With the increasing number of participants nationwide, the tournament in 2012 was hosted for the first time outside of Bangkok in Khon Kaen province by Khon Kaen University. This tournament is also the first to receive the royal patronage of Crown Princess Maha Chakri Sirindhorn in its trophies to winners.

In 2015, the tournament was reverted to Thammasat University as the host.

The EU Thailand Inter-varsity Debate Championship is now the largest and most anticipated national Inter-varsity English debate tournament in Thailand, involving more than 500 students more than 20 academic institutions. It is a direct channel for young people to engage in productive cultural, political, and economic exchanges of ideas.

Past winners

References

Debating competitions
Recurring events established in 2004
2004 establishments in Thailand
Thammasat University